John Towneley (16 February 1806 – 21 February 1878) was an English Whig politician.

He was elected at the 1841 general election as a Member of Parliament (MP) for Beverley, and held the seat until he did not stand at the 1852 general election.

Personal life 
A son of Peregrine Edward Towneley of Towneley Hall and Charlotte Drummond. He  married Lucy Tichborne, the daughter of Henry Joseph Tichborne, (the 8th Baronet) and Anne Burke on 28 October 1840.

They had five children, including Mabel, who married Lewis Henry Hugh Clifford, 9th Baron Clifford of Chudleigh, and Mary, who became a nun and Provincial of the English Province of Notre Dame Nuns. Their only son, Richard, died unmarried in 1877.

When his brother Colonel Charles Towneley, raised the new 5th Royal Lancashire Militia in 1853, John was commissioned as one of the Majors. When Charles retired from the command in 1863, John was promoted to Lieutenant-Colonel to succeed him. He also succeeded Charles as Honorary Colonel of the regiment on Charles's death in 1876.

John also inherited the Towneley estates, including the Lordship of Bowland, in 1876. As John's only son Richard died before he did, it became necessary to divide the estate between the seven daughters of the two men, requiring a private Act of Parliament.

References 

1806 births
1878 deaths
Whig (British political party) MPs
Members of the Parliament of the United Kingdom for English constituencies
UK MPs 1841–1847
UK MPs 1847–1852
Lancashire Militia officers